"Gypsies on Parade" is a song recorded by American country music group Sawyer Brown.  It was released in December 1986 as the second single from the album Out Goin' Cattin'.  The song reached #25 on the Billboard Hot Country Singles & Tracks chart.  The song was written by Sawyer Brown's lead vocalist Mark Miller.

Chart performance

References

1986 singles
1986 songs
Sawyer Brown songs
Songs written by Mark Miller (musician)
Capitol Records Nashville singles
Curb Records singles